Barbara Ess (born Barbara Eileen Schwartz; April 4, 1944 – March 4, 2021) was an American photographer. She often used a pinhole camera and was known for her No Wave musical and editorial work.

Education
Ess earned a B.A. at the University of Michigan and attended the London School of Film Technique.

Photography
Barbara Ess was known primarily for her large-scale ambient and shadowy photographs that were often made with a pinhole camera. They usually were printed with just one earthy color, such as amber]or muted blue-black. They are shown internationally in solo and group exhibitions and reviewed extensively.

Her images are intentionally left vague and unresolved. As such, they initiate a range of emotions from dream anxiety and helplessness, to being captivated by a fantasy and the romantic aesthetic quality of her old-fashioned pinhole method. Her pictures hark back to the nineteenth-century approach to fine-art photography known as Pictorialism and to the well-known amateur photographer Julia Margaret Cameron. The Pictorialists and Cameron often included nature, women, and children as subject matter, creating tableau vivant imagery that evoked moody, open-ended narratives.

Of her intent as a photographer, Ess said "In a way I try to photograph what cannot be photographed."
 
She received grants from LINE, Creative Artists Public Service Program, and Kitchen Media, and fellowships from Mid Atlantic Arts Foundation and the National Endowment for the Arts (photography).

She taught photography at Bard College since 1997.

Music
Ess performed and recorded post-punk music with bands starting in 1978, including The Static, Disband, Y Pants and Ultra Vulva. She often performed at art galleries, at the Mudd Club and at Tier 3. Ess remained musically active throughout the 1980s, contributing tracks to Tellus Audio Cassette Magazine and collaborating with Peggy Ahwesh on 2001's Radio Guitar for the Ecstatic Peace! label.

Editorial work: Just Another Asshole

Just Another Asshole was a no wave mixed media publication project launched from the Lower East Side of Manhattan from 1978 to 1987. Barbara Ess organized and edited seven issues of Just Another Asshole, which formed thanks to an open, collaborative submission process. Issues 3 and 4 were co-edited by Jane Sherry and issues 5 through 7 were co-edited by Glenn Branca. Issue formats include: zine, LP record, large format tabloid, magazine, exhibition catalog, and paperback book.

Collections
Ess' work is in the collections of the Museum of Contemporary Art Los Angeles, the Whitney Museum of American Art, and the San Francisco Museum of Modern Art, among others.

Bibliography
 I Am Not This Body: The Pinhole Photographs of Barbara Ess by Guy Armstrong, Michael Cunningham, Thurston Moore and Barbara Ess (June 15, 2005)

See also

No Wave
Mudd Club
Tier 3

Footnotes

References
Andrea Karnes, "Barbara Ess," Camera Austria 27 (October 1988): 17
Carlo McCormick, "The Downtown Book: The New York Art Scene, 1974–1984", Princeton University Press, 2006

External links
 
 
 Barbara Ess (with Barbara Barg) - You Who Know No Pain (7:07) track on Tellus Audio Cassette Magazine #1

1948 births
2021 deaths
20th-century American photographers
20th-century American women artists
20th-century American musicians
20th-century American women musicians
21st-century American photographers
21st-century American women artists
American women photographers
Postmodern artists
Photographers from New York City
Musicians from Brooklyn
American experimental musicians
American noise musicians
Feminist musicians
University of Michigan alumni
Artists from Brooklyn
National Endowment for the Arts Fellows
Bard College faculty
American post-punk musicians
American women academics
Women in punk